Charleswood Curling Club is located in the southwestern area of Winnipeg, in the community of Charleswood. The club was founded in 1946 as a three sheet rink, although expansion to five sheets was completed in 1956. It was the home club of the Jeff Stoughton team.

Provincial champions

References
Charleswood Curling Club 

Sports venues in Winnipeg
Curling clubs in Canada
1946 establishments in Manitoba

Curling_Club
Sports venues completed in 1956